Norman Mashabane (26 June 1956 in Phalaborwa – 10 October 2007) was a former South African ambassador to Indonesia. He was born in Phalaborwa. He was recalled from that country after sexual harassment charges were laid against him. He was subsequently cleared by a foreign affairs inquiry.

For a short time thereafter he was an adviser to then Limpopo premier Sello Moloto, and a member of the Limpopo provincial legislature. He was later found guilty of sexual harassment charges in the Pretoria High Court, and quit his post as political adviser. He died in a car accident outside the provincial capital Polokwane.

Notes

External links
The Sowetan: Mashabane, son lauded in death
The Sunday Times: Mashabane killed in car crash
The Sunday Times: Norman Mashabane: Envoy tainted by charges of being a sex pest
IOL:Sex pest Mashabane quits

1956 births
2007 deaths
People from Limpopo
Ambassadors of South Africa to Indonesia
South African politicians convicted of crimes
Road incident deaths in South Africa